Richard Peter Dubee, Jr. (born October 19, 1957) is a former Major League Baseball (MLB) coach. He has previously coached at the Major League level for the Florida Marlins (now Miami Marlins), Philadelphia Phillies, and Detroit Tigers.

Playing career
Dubee was drafted in the third round of the 1976 MLB draft by the Kansas City Royals. He pitched six years in the Royals system and finished his career 45–49 with a 4.07 earned run average and twenty-six complete games.

Coaching career

Dubee began his coaching career with the Kansas City Royals in 1982. He was the Florida Marlins pitching coach from 1998 to 2001. He then served as the pitching coach for the Philadelphia Phillies from 2005 to 2013. The 2013 season was Dubee's thirteenth and final season in the Phillies organization, and ninth as pitching coach.

He was hired as the Atlanta Braves Minor League pitching coordinator in November 2013, replacing Dave Wallace.

On October 29, 2015 Dubee was named the new pitching coach for the Detroit Tigers, replacing retiring Jeff Jones.

Personal
Dubee married Maureen Carroll in 1979.  They have two children, Megan and Michael. Michael was drafted and signed by the Phillies in the 18th round of the 2006 MLB draft. Megan is a 2005 graduate of the University of Florida.

References

External links

1957 births
Living people
Daytona Beach Islanders players
Detroit Tigers coaches
Florida Marlins coaches
Gulf Coast Royals players
Jacksonville Suns players
Major League Baseball pitching coaches
Omaha Royals players
Philadelphia Phillies coaches
Sportspeople from Brockton, Massachusetts
Waterloo Royals players